Calandrinia feltonii  is a species of flowering plant in the family Montiaceae known by the common name Felton's flower.  It is named after Arthur Felton, a resident of the Falkland Islands, who sent specimens of the plant in 1910 to Swedish botanist Carl Skottsberg.

It is endemic to the Falklands where it nearly became extinct in the wild through overgrazing.  It is an annual herb, low-growing and fleshy, with bright, pinkish-purple flowers.

References

Notes

Sources
 

feltonii
Flora of the Falkland Islands